Coleophora symphistropha is a moth of the family Coleophoridae. It is found in Turkey.

References

symphistropha
Endemic fauna of Turkey
Moths described in 1976
Moths of Asia